"Itchycoo Park" is a song written by Steve Marriott and Ronnie Lane, first recorded by their group, the Small Faces. Largely written by Lane, it was one of the first music recordings to feature flanging, an effect at that time made possible by electro-mechanical processes. The single was not featured on any of their UK albums, but was however featured on the North American release There Are But Four Small Faces.

Released on 4 August 1967 on Immediate Records, the song was the Small Faces' fifth top-ten song in the UK Singles Chart, reaching a position of number three. "Itchycoo Park" became the Small Faces' sole top-forty hit in the United States, reaching number sixteen on the Billboard Hot 100 in early 1968. In Continental Europe, it reached the top ten in several countries, while in Canada and New Zealand it was a number one hit. The single was re-released in December 1975, reaching number nine in the UK Singles chart, and is often attributed as the reason for the Small Faces reunion during the mid-1970s.

The song has since been covered by several other artists, most notably by English band M People in 1995, whose dance rendition of the song reached number eleven in the UK.

The location and etymology of the titular park has long been debated, many claiming it to be Little Ilford Park in Manor Park, East London, Valentine's Park in Ilford or Wanstead Flats in Wanstead, East London.

Song profile
"Itchycoo Park" was released by The Small Faces in August 1967.  Together with "Lazy Sunday", "Tin Soldier" and "All or Nothing", the song is one of the band's biggest hits and has become a classic of its time.

The song reached number 16 in the American Billboard Hot 100 chart in 1968, during a chart run of 16 weeks. In Canada, the song reached number 1.

Long running British music magazine NME cites readers poll voting "Itchycoo Park" number 62 out of the top 100 singles of all time.

"Itchycoo Park" climbed the charts again when it was re-released on 13 December 1975.

The song was one of the first pop singles to use flanging, an effect that can be heard on the drums in the bridge section after each chorus. Most sources credit the use of the effect to Olympic Studios engineer George Chkiantz who showed it to the Small Faces' regular engineer Glyn Johns; he in turn demonstrated it to the group, who were always on the lookout for innovative production sounds, and they readily agreed to its use on the single.

Although many devices were soon created that could produce the same effect by purely electronic means, the effect as used on "Itchycoo Park" was at that time an electro-mechanical studio process. Two synchronised tape copies of a finished recording were played simultaneously into a third master recorder, and by manually retarding the rotation of one of the two tape reels by pressing on the flanges, a skilled engineer could subtly manipulate the phase difference between the two sources, creating the lush 'swooshing' phase effect that sweeps up and down the frequency range. The original single version was mixed and mastered in mono, and the phasing effect is more pronounced in the mono mix than in the later stereo mix.

Inspiration
The song was first conceived and largely written by Ronnie Lane, who had been reading a leaflet on the virtues of Oxford which mentioned its dreaming spires.

A number of sources claim the song's name is derived from the nickname of Little Ilford Park, on Church Road in the London suburb of Manor Park, where Small Faces' singer and songwriter Steve Marriott grew up. The "itchycoo" nickname is, in turn, attributed to the stinging nettles which grew there. Other sources cite nearby Wanstead Flats (Manor Park end) as the inspiration for the song.

Marriott and Small Faces manager Tony Calder came up with the well-known story when Marriott was told the BBC had banned the song for its overt drug references, Calder confirms:

Ronnie Lane said of the true location of Itchycoo Park: "It's a place we used to go to in Ilford years ago. Some bloke we know suggested it to us because it's full of nettles and you keep scratching actually".

Other possible etymologies
In an interview Steve Marriott stated that Itchycoo Park is Valentine's Park in Ilford. "We used to go there and get stung by wasps. It's what we used to call it." This was reiterated by actor Tony Robinson, a childhood friend of Marriott.

The term "Itchycoo" also appears in the Scots language from around the 1950s.

Steve Marriott once said of The Small Faces "(We) were a mix of R&B and music hall. The R&B came from Detroit, the music hall from Stepney. That's what 'Itchycoo Park' is about… having a drink and a party."

Itchy Park refers to the grounds of Christ Church, Spitalfields in the East End of London, laid out as gardens in 1890.

Personnel 
According to the liner notes of the 2012 7" re-master:

 Steve Marriottlead and backing vocals, guitar
 Ronnie Lanebacking vocals, bass guitar
 Ian McLaganbacking vocals, organ, piano
 Kenney Jonesdrums, percussion

Charts

Weekly charts

Year-end charts

Certifications

M People version

British band M People released a dance version of "Itchycoo Park" in November 1995. The track was released as the second single from their reissued and expanded version of the 1994 Bizarre Fruit album, Bizarre Fruit II (1995). It peaked at number 11 at the UK Singles Chart and was remixed by David Morales. The song also peaked at number 21 in New Zealand, number 24 in Iceland, number 27 in Australia, and number 22 on the Eurochart Hot 100.

Critical reception
Scottish newspaper Aberdeen Press and Journal described the song as "refreshing". Jose F. Promis from AllMusic deemed it an "epic version". Larry Flick from Billboard noted that front woman Heather Small "whips through" the cover version "with a smooth blend of streetwise edge and sophisticated flair." He added, "Her distinctive way with a lyric is the stuff of future legends." A reviewer from Music & Media felt that "chart darlings M People have reworked this Small Faces classic with equal measures of dance beats, a Billy Joel/River Of Dreams piano sound and marvellous gospel undertones. Their innovative arrangements will take them high into the charts with this one."

Music video
The accompanying music video for "Itchycoo Park" was directed by Maria Mochnacz.

Track listing

Charts

Uses and other notable versions

1984: covered by progressive rock band The Enid
1992: Rymes with Orange, on the album Peel
1993: Blue Murder cover on the album Nothin' But Trouble
1993: Heavy metal band Quiet Riot covered on the album Terrified.
1996: covered by Ben Lee for the I Shot Andy Warhol soundtrack
1996: Tasmin Archer covered the song as a bonus track to the Japanese edition of her album Bloom
1996: The song is featured in the soundtrack to the Australian film Mr. Reliable
1999: Itchycoo Park 1999 was a "Pre-Bonnaroo" like music festival in Manchester, Tennessee, the same place in which Bonnaroo is today. The festival was successful its first year but did not fulfill its plans to return in 2000.
1999: The song can be heard in the marijuana documentary Grass.
2006: The original version is heard in the opening scenes of the British film Severance starring Danny Dyer.
2009: Used in soundtrack for the movie The Men Who Stare at Goats starring George Clooney, Ewan McGregor and Jeff Bridges.
 New Zealand/Australian band Dragon covered the song on their album It's All Too Beautiful (2011). 
2015: Covered by Nellie McKay on her album My Weekly Reader.
2015: Covered by Alice Cooper's Hollywood Vampires on their debut album.
2018: The song can be heard in the Season 2 finale of The Handmaid's Tale.  Commander Lawrence plays the song at his home.

References

Further reading

Paolo Hewitt/John Hellier (2004). Steve Marriott - All Too Beautiful....  Helter Skelter Publishing .
Paolo Hewitt/Kenney Jones (1995) Small Faces: The Young Mods' Forgotten Story – Acid Jazz

External links
The Small Faces Official Site

1967 singles
1999 singles
Small Faces songs
Psychedelic pop songs
Songs about London
Songs written by Steve Marriott
Songs written by Ronnie Lane
M People songs
1995 singles
1967 songs
Deconstruction Records singles
Immediate Records singles
House music songs
RPM Top Singles number-one singles
Number-one singles in New Zealand